Diabolique is a 1996 American psychological thriller film directed by Jeremiah Chechik, written by Henri-Georges Clouzot and Don Roos, and starring Sharon Stone, Isabelle Adjani, Chazz Palminteri, and Kathy Bates. The plot follows the wife and mistress of an abusive schoolmaster who find themselves stalked by an unknown assailant after murdering him and disposing of his body.

The film is a remake of the French film Les Diaboliques (1955) directed by Clouzot, which was based on the novel She Who Was No More by Pierre Boileau and Thomas Narcejac.

Plot 
Mia Baran is a devout Catholic schoolteacher at a boys' school outside Pittsburgh where her husband, Guy, is schoolmaster. Guy is abusive to the weak Mia, a former nun who suffers from cardiomyopathy; his mistress, Nicole Horner, a fellow teacher at the school, is protective of Mia. When both women grow tired of his abuses, they collaborate to murder him in an apartment owned by a family friend of Nicole's. The women lure him there, and Mia drugs him before they successfully drown him in a bathtub. They wrap his body in a shower curtain and place it in a wicker box.

While en route to the school, Nicole crashes Guy's car in a pileup on the interstate, but the wicker box goes unnoticed by authorities. The women arrive at the school in the middle of the night, and dump Guy's corpse in the unkempt swimming pool on the property, staging his death as an accidental drowning. When his body fails to rise to the surface after several days, Nicole has the pool drained, but Guy's body is nowhere to be found. The women subsequently discover photos taken of them on the day of Guy's murder, and believe someone is blackmailing them.

After reading about the discovery of a John Doe in a nearby river, Mia goes to view the body at the sheriff's station, but finds it is not Guy. There, she attracts the attention of Shirley Vogel, a retired police officer-turned-private investigator who offers to look into Guy's disappearance. Nicole is resistant, and Shirley quickly becomes suspicious of the women. Their fears of a blackmailer are confirmed when Mia discovers the shower curtain used to conceal Guy's body hanging in her bathroom window.

Shirley confronts Mia with the accident report from Guy's car, and surmises that Guy was en route to see her in Pittsburgh on the day he disappeared. Mia grows increasingly paranoid, believing Guy is alive and stalking the women. This fear increases when two videographers filming an event at the school capture an image of Guy standing in one of the building's windows. Later, while investigating the school's basement, Shirley is attacked and knocked unconscious.

That night, Mia finds Guy floating in her bathtub, and witnesses him rise from the water. Terrified, she loses consciousness and collapses, apparently suffering a heart attack. Nicole arrives, and it is revealed that she and Guy had planned the series of events to scare Mia to the point of heart failure. Nicole laments, however, and tells Guy she had wanted to call it off. While overlooking Mia's body, Nicole realizes she is in fact not dead; when Guy realizes she is alive, he attacks both women, knocking Nicole unconscious.

Mia flees downstairs, and Guy tackles her to the ground in front of the pool and attempts to drown her. Nicole manages to stop him by driving a garden rake into his head, and he falls into the pool. As Nicole attempts to revive Mia, Guy pulls her into the pool and tries to drown her. Mia enters the pool, and together, both women successfully drown him. They exit the pool and are confronted by Shirley, who punches Mia in the face; willing to cover for the women, she explains it will help prove self-defense in Guy's murder. Mia walks away from the pool, distraught, and Shirley smokes a cigarette while watching Guy's body sink to the bottom.

Cast
Sharon Stone as Nicole Horner
Isabelle Adjani as Mia Baran
Chazz Palminteri as Guy Baran
Kathy Bates as Shirley Vogel
Spalding Gray as Simon Veatch
Shirley Knight as Edie Danziger
Allen Garfield as Leo Katzman
Adam Hann-Byrd as Erik Pretzer
Clea Lewis as Lisa Campos
Bingo O'Malley as Gannon
Donal Logue as Video Photographer #1
J. J. Abrams as Video Photographer #2

Production
Filming took place in and around Pittsburgh, Pennsylvania. The St. Philomena School was used as the primarily filming location.

The 1994 film adaptation of The Flintstones features a character named Sharon Stone as an in-joke; that movie's producers later tried to hire the real Stone for the role. Since she was shooting Diabolique at the time, Stone had to turn the part down, a decision she later claimed to regret.

Reception

Critical
The movie was compared unfavorably to the original movie, and received overall negative reviews. It currently holds a 'rotten' 23% rating on Rotten Tomatoes based on 31 reviews with the consensus: "This seedy remake of a classic French chiller goes through the motions in recreating the original's diabolical plot, but without the genuine suspense or stylistic finesse."

Stone was nominated for a Razzie Award for "Worst New Star" (as the new "serious" Sharon Stone) for this film and Last Dance, where she lost to Pamela Anderson for Barb Wire. Audiences surveyed by CinemaScore gave the film a grade of "C+" on a scale of A+ to F.

Box office
The movie was a box office bomb, grossing $17 million in the USA. In other territories the movie performed better, grossing $45 million in total.

References

External links

1996 films
1990s psychological thriller films
1990s English-language films
American neo-noir films
American psychological thriller films
American remakes of French films
Films set in boarding schools
Films based on French novels
Films based on mystery novels
Films based on works by Boileau-Narcejac
Films directed by Jeremiah S. Chechik
Films scored by Randy Edelman
Films set in Pittsburgh
Films set in schools
Films shot in Pittsburgh
Films with screenplays by Don Roos
Mariticide in fiction
Morgan Creek Productions films
Warner Bros. films
Henri-Georges Clouzot
1990s American films